Bikus (also Romanized as Bīkūs and Bikows; also known as Bekos) is a village in Mangur-e Gharbi Rural District, in the Central District of Piranshahr County, West Azerbaijan Province, Iran. At the 2006 census, its population was 534, in 80 families.

References 

Populated places in Piranshahr County